Arm recoil is a neurological examination of neonate for detecting the muscle tone.

Procedure
The baby is placed supine, with forearm flexed at elbow. The elbow (forearm) is extended by pulling the hand; then released.

Observation
How quickly the forearm returns to flexed original position and the amount of flexion will designate a score.

 Grade 0: Arms remain extended 180 degrees or abnormal movements begin
 Grade 1: Minimal flexion, 140-180 degrees
 Grade 2: Slight flexion, 110-140 degrees
 Grade 3: Moderate flexion, 90-110 degrees
 Grade 4: Quick return to full flexion, less than 90 degrees

Conclusions
The greater the tone development (flexor tone), the brisker the recoil will be. This correlates to more advanced gestational age on the Ballard Scale.

Leg recoil can be assessed following the same principle.

References

Infancy
Muscular system
Physical examination